The John Abbott II House is located at 2200 Kuser Road in Hamilton Township of Mercer County, New Jersey. It was built . The house is currently used as a museum by the Historical Society of Hamilton Township and is open to the public. It was added to the National Register of Historic Places on June 18, 1976, for its significance in architecture, military history, and politics/government.

History and description
During the American Revolution, Samuel Tucker, the state treasurer, fleeing the British advance on Trenton, removed the money in his care to the home of John Abbott II.  The location of the funds was betrayed by Mrs. Mary Pointing, who led a 500-strong detachment of British troops to the house.  In ransacking the home, the soldiers discovered Tucker's trunk with his personal effects and £1500 in unsigned paper money.  However, the specie money was hidden by the family in the bottom of tubs in the cellar, covered with broken dishes and household utensils.  The tubs escaped close inspection and the money was kept from British hands.

See also
 National Register of Historic Places listings in Mercer County, New Jersey
 List of the oldest buildings in New Jersey

References

Hamilton Township, Mercer County, New Jersey
National Register of Historic Places in Mercer County, New Jersey
Houses in Mercer County, New Jersey
Historic house museums in New Jersey
New Jersey Register of Historic Places